WTCH (960 AM, "Moose Country AM 960") is a radio station broadcasting a classic country music format. Licensed to Shawano, Wisconsin, United States, the station is currently owned by Results Broadcasting Inc. and features programming from CBS Radio Network and Westwood One.

References

External links
 

TCH
Classic country radio stations in the United States
Shawano County, Wisconsin